Redding station may refer to:

Redding station (California), an Amtrak station in Redding, California
Redding (Metro-North station), a Metro-North Railroad station in Redding, Connecticut

See also
Redding (disambiguation)
Reading station (disambiguation)